Knattspyrnufélag Austfjarða, commonly known as just KFA, is an Icelandic football club from the municipality of Fjarðabyggð located on the east coast of Iceland.

History
KFA is composed of the following clubs in Fjarðabyggð:
  (Neskaupsstaður)
  (Eskifjörður)
  (Reyðarfjörður)
  (Fáskrúðsfjörður)
  (Stöðvarfjörður) and
  (Breiðdalsvík).

With the establishment of KFA all the main sports clubs in the municipality have banded together in fielding a football team.

Current squad

References

Football clubs in Iceland
Association football clubs established in 2022